The 2019 RAN Sevens  was the 20th edition of the annual rugby sevens tournament organized by Rugby Americas North. It was played at the Truman Bodden Sports Complex in George Town, Cayman Islands, with the winner eligible for the 2020 Summer Olympics, and the next two teams qualified for a 2020 repechage tournament. With Canada already a core team in the World Rugby Sevens Series, the top team among the remainder was eligible for the 2020 Hong Kong Sevens qualifying tournament.

Teams
The following eight teams will participate:

Pool stage
All times in Eastern Standard Time (UTC−05:00)

Pool A

Pool B

Knockout stage

Plate

Cup

Standings

References

Rugby sevens at the 2020 Summer Olympics – Men's qualification
2019
2019 rugby sevens competitions
2019 in North American rugby union
rugby union
rugby union
Qualification tournaments for the 2019 Pan American Games
July 2019 sports events in North America